Somerset County Council is the county council of Somerset in the South West of England, an elected local government authority responsible for the most significant local government services in most of the county.

On 1 April 2023 the county council will be abolished and replaced by a new unitary authority for the area at present served by the county council.  The new council will be known as Somerset Council,
and will made up by the same 110 councillors elected to Somerset County Council in 2022.

Area covered
Created by the Local Government Act 1888, with effect from 1889, the County Council administered the whole ceremonial county of Somerset, except for the county borough of Bath. With the creation of the county of Avon in 1974, a large part of the north of the county (now the unitary authorities of North Somerset and Bath and North East Somerset) was taken out of Somerset and moved into the new county. However, Avon was disbanded on 1 April 1996 and the two new administratively independent unitary authorities were established.

The area now covered by the county council consists of the four remaining non-unitary districts of Somerset – Mendip, Sedgemoor, South Somerset, and, since April 2019, Somerset West and Taunton.

History

Somerset can claim a longer continuously-known history of official record keeping than any other county in England. A meeting of Quarter Sessions held at Wells in 1617 decided that a room should be provided "for the safe keeping of the records of the Sessions."

County Councils were first introduced in England and Wales, with full powers from 22 September 1889, as a result of the Local Government Act 1888, taking over administrative functions until then carried out by the unelected Quarter Sessions. The areas they covered were termed administrative counties and were not in all cases identical to the traditional shire counties, but in Somerset the whole 'ceremonial county' came under the authority of the new council.

The new system of local democracy was a significant development and reflected the increasing range of functions carried out by local government in late Victorian Britain. Schools (both primary and secondary) were added to the County Council's responsibilities in 1902, and until the 1990s it was also responsible for operating Colleges of Further Education.

Until 1974, Somerset had a large number of urban district and rural district councils. In 1974, local government was reorganized in England and Wales generally, and in Somerset the former urban and rural districts were amalgamated into a much smaller number of district councils.

In 2007, proposals to merge the surviving district councils with the county council into a single unitary authority were rejected at a referendum following local opposition and were subsequently abandoned by the Department for Communities and Local Government.  However, in 2020, a unitary authority was suggested again as a way for Somerset’s district councils to cooperate and to save money rather than the two-tier system.  A news report suggested that although it would save £40 million, it could cost £86million to implement.

In February 2021, the ruling Conservative group of Somerset County Council rejected calls from opposition councillors from the Green Party and the Liberal Democrats for the county to take part in a future trial of universal basic income.

In April 2023, the county and district councils will be abolished and replaced by the unitary Somerset Council. Elections for the new council took place in May 2022 and the elected councillors will serve just under one year on the county council before moving onto the unitary council.

Functions
Somerset County Council is responsible for the more strategic local services of Somerset, with a changing pattern of lower-tier authorities existing alongside it within its area and responsible for other more local services, such as waste collection. The Council provides a wide range of services, including education (schools, libraries and youth services), social services, highway maintenance, waste disposal, emergency planning, consumer protection and town and country planning for matters to do with minerals, waste, highways and education. This makes it one of the largest employers in Somerset. The Council outsourced some work to a joint venture with IBM, SouthWest One, created in 2007. In September 2012 the Council prepared to sue Southwest One as a result of a procurement quality dispute.

Somerset County Council contributes to encouraging businesses to relocate to the county through the inward investment agency Into Somerset.

Somerset County Council appoints eight members to the Devon and Somerset Fire and Rescue Authority.

Somerset County Council is also responsible for many children's services.  In 2013 and 2015, Ofsted inspectors rated it, "inadequate". In 2018 Ofsted inspectors said services were better but still "require improvement to be good".  Services for children requiring protection need improvement, children in foster care are moved to new placements too often.

Funding cuts
Somerset County Council needed to save £19.5million in 2017/18, but only cut £11.1million. Cuts were announced to highways, public transport and special needs services. Staff will be told to take two days off unpaid for the coming two years. The chief executive said he had, "no choice" because of cuts to central government funding. Further proposed cuts include, reducing winter gritting, suspending 'park and ride' services, stopping funding for Citizens Advice, cutting adult social care and support for people with learning difficulties, cuts to funding, and jobs, cuts from the GetSet programme which helps stop vulnerable young people needing social care. There will be reduction to help for vulnerable families and children with special educational needs, youth services, road-gritting, flood prevention, among other cuts.

In July 2018, two senior Conservatives councillors resigned over concerns regarding the Council's handling of financial matters. Dean Ruddle and Neil Bloomfield had previous held roles as the respective chair and vice chair of the audit committee. An official audit of the council criticised its "pervasive" overspending and its failure to deliver sufficient savings over the previous 12months.

In September 2018, the Council voted through £28million of spending cuts, spread over the next two years. Critics of the cuts, including Labour and Liberal Democrat councillors, noted that between 2009 and 2016, Somerset’s Conservatives administration had voted to freeze council tax, when an increase of 1.9% would have brought in an additional £114million.

Children's services 
In January 2013, Ofsted inspectors gave Somerset Councils' Children’s Services the lowest rating of "inadequate".

In January 2015, Ofsted reinspected the Children’s Services Department and concluded that it remained "inadequate". The corresponding report found no improvement in the care provided by the children's services and described a "corporate failure" to keep children safe. Ofsted found there were "widespread or serious failures" which it considered placed children to be harmed or at risk of harm. The report also identified managers who "have not been able to demonstrate sufficient understanding of failures" and had been ineffective in "prioritising, challenging and making improvements".

In January 2015, Julian Wooster was appointed director of Children's Services, the fifth such appointment in five years.

In November 2017, the service was inspected by Ofsted. Services were judged to have improved, but still "require[d] improvement to be good" in all but one area. The report found that services for children needing help and protection required improvement, as did leadership, management and governance. The inspectors concluded that too many children in foster care experienced moves between placements before they were found the right home. Inspectors singled out adoption services as being "good".

Governance
Somerset County Council operates the local government cabinet system which was introduced by the Local Government Act 2000. Previously called the "Executive Board", the Cabinet consists of six county councillors and is the county council's main decision making body, taking most important decisions about its functions. Each of the members of the Cabinet is directly responsible for a particular area of county council activities.

Decisions to do with the planning matters dealt with by the county council and other regulatory matters are still taken in a committee called the Regulation Committee.

Elections 

The first elections to the new county council were held on 23 January 1889. Since then, members have been elected for a term of office (initially three years, now four), with elections held all together on the "first past the post" system. 

Until the early 1970s, the County Council still included aldermen. Of a total of 92 members, 69 were elected every three years by ratepayers, and 23 were aldermen, chosen by the 69 elected members. The aldermen served for six years, so after each triennial election either eleven or twelve were appointed, these numbers alternating. Until 1910, the outgoing aldermen could also vote on such appointments. As voting members of the council, aldermen were finally abolished in 1974 under the Local Government Act 1972 so that there are now only the elected members, each of the 55 present county divisions electing a single member up to 2017, and then two members for the final 2022 election. 

The final election to the county council in May 2022, returned councillors in the following numbers: - 61 Liberal Democrats, 36 Conservatives, five Labour members, five Green Party and three independent members.

Notable members 
Incomplete list, in chronological order 
Sir Edward Strachey, 3rd Baronet (1889–1892)
Henry Hobhouse (from the 1890s), later Chairman of Council, also Member of Parliament for East Somerset
Sir Frank Beauchamp (1907–1946), created a baronet in 1918
Arthur Hobhouse (1925–1947), previously Member of Parliament for Wells, Chairman of Council 1940–1947
Geoffrey Waldegrave, 12th Earl Waldegrave (first elected 1937)
Sir John Wills, 4th Baronet (1958–1974, Ind.) 
Marshal of the Royal Air Force Sir John Slessor (1963–1974), previously Chief of the Air Staff
Richard Needham (1967–1974), later Member of Parliament for North Wiltshire
Sir Michael Gass (1977–1981), previously acting Governor of Hong Kong
Sir Chris Clarke (1985–2005), Leader of the council from 1993 to 2001
Elizabeth Gass, Lady Gass, member 1985 to 1997, later Lord Lieutenant of Somerset
David Heath (1985–1997), later Member of Parliament for Somerton and Frome
Susan Miller, Baroness Miller of Chilthorne Domer (1989–2005), Liberal Democrat spokesman on Home Affairs
Jackie Ballard (1993–1997), later Member of Parliament for Taunton
Robin Bush (1997–2009), Chairman of Council 2001–2005, also a historian

See also

 High Sheriff of Somerset
 Lord Lieutenant of Somerset
 List of civil parishes in Somerset
 List of places in Somerset

References

External links
 Somerset County Council website

 
County councils of England
1889 establishments in England
Local authorities in Somerset
Local education authorities in England
Major precepting authorities in England
Leader and cabinet executives
Organizations established in 1889
Organizations disestablished in 2023
2023 disestablishments in England